A by-election was held for the Australian House of Representatives seat of Richmond on 18 February 1984. This was triggered by the resignation of National Party Leader MP Doug Anthony. The by-election was held to coincide with the Corangamite and Hughes by-elections.

The election was won by National candidate and future Nationals leader, Charles Blunt, despite challenges from both the Labor and Liberal parties.

Candidates

National Party of Australia – Charles Blunt, State Director of the National Party.
Independent – Fast Bucks. He later stood for the Senate in Queensland in 1984 for the Conservative Party, and as an independent in 1987 in Wills.
Australian Labor Party – Peter Carmont.
Australian Democrats – Simon Clough.
Independent – Denis Griffin.
Liberal Party of Australia – Brian Pezzutti, former national serviceman and president of the Lismore branch of the Liberal Party. He was later elected to the New South Wales Legislative Council.
Uninflated Movement – Nadar Ponnuswamy, Newtown restaurateur and candidate at the October 1983 Marrickville by-election.

Results

See also
 List of Australian federal by-elections

References

1984 elections in Australia
New South Wales federal by-elections
February 1984 events in Australia